Joshua Thomas Owen (March 29, 1822 – November 7, 1887) was an educator, politician, and soldier from Pennsylvania who served as a Union brigadier general during the American Civil War. He commanded the famed Philadelphia Brigade for part of the war, but was relieved of duty for alleged cowardice during battle.

Early life and career
Owen was born in Caermarthen, Wales. He emigrated from his home country to continental Europe in 1830, and later moved to the United States. He was a professor at the Chestnut Hill Academy in Philadelphia, and was a member of the Pennsylvania State Legislature from 1857 to 1869.

Civil War
Owen entered the Civil War as the commander of the nine-month 25th Pennsylvania Infantry. When that unit was discharged, he took command of the 69th Pennsylvania Infantry, a predominantly Irish regiment that was part of the Philadelphia Brigade. He eventually rose to the command of the Philadelphia Brigade in the II Corps, Army of the Potomac. He led the brigade at the Battle of Chancellorsville, where it performed barely any service. Owen was arrested and relieved of brigade command for reasons unknown. He was then replaced by Alexander S. Webb, who led the brigade admirably at Gettysburg.

Owen later returned to his brigade after Gettysburg and led it at the Wilderness, Spotsylvania, and Cold Harbor, where he failed to support another brigade in the famed assault. He was arrested by Maj. Gen. John Gibbon on the charges of cowardice and was discharged from the army.

Postbellum career
After the war, Owen returned to Pennsylvania and served various jobs. He died in Philadelphia and is buried there in Laurel Hill Cemetery.

See also

List of American Civil War generals (Union)

Notes
 Eicher, John H., and Eicher, David J., Civil War High Commands, Palo Alto, California: Stanford University Press, 2001, .
 U.S. War Department, The War of the Rebellion: a Compilation of the Official Records of the Union and Confederate Armies, U.S. Government Printing Office, 1880–1901.

References

External links
  Retrieved 2008-11-24

1821 births
1887 deaths
Politicians from Philadelphia
People from Carmarthen
People of Pennsylvania in the American Civil War
Union Army generals
Welsh emigrants to the United States
Philadelphia Brigade
Members of the Pennsylvania House of Representatives
Burials at Laurel Hill Cemetery (Philadelphia)
19th-century American politicians